Empire Faun was a  Coastal tanker that was built in 1942 by Goole Shipbuilding and Repairing Co Ltd, Goole, United Kingdom for the Ministry of War Transport (MoWT). She was loaned to the Greek Navy in 1959 as BN Poseidon. In 1959, she was transferred to the Royal Fleet Auxiliary as RFA Sirius. She was sold to the Greek Navy in 1962.

Description
The ship was a Coastal tanker built in 1942 by Goole Shipbuilding and Repairing Co Ltd, Goole, United Kingdom. She was yard number 389.

The engine was built by the Amos & Smith Ltd, Hull.

History
Empire Faun was built by Goole Shipbuilding and Repairing Co Ltd, Goole, United Kingdom. She was launched on 12 October 1942 and completed in February 1943. Built for the MOWT, she was placed under the management of Coastal Tankers Ltd. The United Kingdom Official Number 1169080 and Code Letters BFGC were allocated. Her port of registry was Goole.

Empire Faun was a member of Convoy EN 217, which departed from Methil, Fife on 16 April 1943 and arrived at Loch Ewe two days later. She then sailed to Gibraltar, from where she departed on 22 June 1943 as a member of Convoy GTX 3, which arrived at Port Said, Egypt on 4 July. She left the convoy at Bizerta, Algeria on 2 July.

Empire Faun departed from Naples, Italy under escort on 28 June 1944 for Civitavecchia. She departed under escort on 3 July for Naples, from where she departed on 12 August as a member of Convoy SM 1A in support of Operation Dragoon, arriving at Ajaccio, Sicily the next day. Empire Faun departed from Marseille, Bouches-du-Rhône, France on 8 October as a member of Convoy SRM 16, which arrived at Naples on 10 October. She then sailed to Taranto, Italy, from where she departed on 24 October with Convoy HP 1, which arrived at Piraeus Greece on 27 October. Listed as a member of Convoy PH 5, she actually departed from Piraeus on 22 November under escort for Bari, Italy. Empire Faun departed from Bari under escort on 31 December and arrived at Ancona, Italy the next day.

Empire Faun departed from Ancona on 2 February 1945 as a member of Convoy HA 9/2, which arrived at Bari two days later. In 1945, management was transferred to the Anglo-Saxon Petroleum Co Ltd. Her Code Letters were later changed to MLZQ.

In 1951, Empire Faun was loaned to the Greek Navy and renamed Poseidon.  In 1959, Poseidon was transferred to the Royal Fleet Auxiliary as RFA Sirius. The Pennant number A345 was allocated. In 1962, RFA Sirius was sold to the Greek Navy.

References

1942 ships
Ships built in Goole
Empire ships
Ministry of War Transport ships
Merchant ships of the United Kingdom
Auxiliary ships of the Hellenic Navy
Ships of the Royal Fleet Auxiliary